The Libyan national basketball team represents Libya in international basketball matches and is controlled by the Kurat As-Sallah al-Leebiyyah (Libyan Basketball Federation). Libya has been an official affiliate of FIBA since 1961.

They finished 5th at the African Basketball Championship twice. The country hosted the 2009 event where they finished 11th, ahead of heavily favored Morocco and Mozambique.

Performance at international competitions
Overall, Libya has competed in many international competitions, including the 2005 Islamic Solidarity Games, and the 2007 Pan Arab Games. The Libyan national team participated in the FIBA Africa Championship games four times, in 1965, 1970, 1978 and 2009, where they placed fifth, fifth, tenth and eleventh respectively.

Summer Olympics
Yet to qualify

World championships
Yet to qualify

FIBA Africa Championship

Pan Arab Games

2004:

Mediterranean Games

Never participated

Beginning with the 2018 event, regular basketball was replaced by 3x3 basketball.

Islamic Solidarity Games

2005 : 11th
2013 : Did Not Participate
Beginning with the 2017 event, regular basketball was replaced by 3x3 basketball.

Arab Nations Cup

1978-2005 : ?
2007 : Quarterfinals
2008 : First Round
2009 : Quarterfinals
2011-2018 : Did Not Participate
2020 : To Be Determined

2008 Edition
Libya competed in the Arabian Basketball Cup 2008 in Group B alongside the Tunisia national basketball team, Algeria national basketball team, Iraq national basketball team, and Saudi Arabia national basketball team. In group play, they finished with 2 wins (versus Saudi Arabia, and Iraq) and 2 losses (versus Algeria and Tunisia).  After their 70–59 victory over Iraq, and a 65–60 win against Saudi Arabia, the Libyan team can entered the second stage of the league because Tunisia defeated Algeria on 30 October 2008. After completing their matches in the competition, the Libyan team's full results were the following:
Group B: 
Libya 67–83 
Libya 39–91 
Libya 70–59 
Libya 65–60

Current roster  
At the 2015 Afrobasket qualification: (last publicized squad)

 

|}

| valign="top" |

Head coach

Assistant coaches

Legend

Club – describes lastclub before the tournament
Age – describes ageon 19 August 2015

|}

Depth chart

Head coach position
 Kevin Nickelberry – 2009

Kit

Manufacturer
2009: Nike

Past rosters 
Team for the 2009 FIBA Africa Championship.

See also
Libya national under-19 basketball team
Eslam El Karbal
Suleiman Ali Nashnush

References

External links
Libyan Arab Basketball Federation
Libya Basketball Records at FIBA Archive
Presentation on Facebook

Men's national basketball teams
Men
Basketball teams in Libya
Basketball
1961 establishments in Libya